Bartholomew is an English or Jewish (generally also Christian) given name that derives from the Aramaic name meaning "son of Talmai". Bar is Aramaic for "son", and marks patronyms. Talmai either comes from telem "furrow" or is a Hebrew version of Ptolemy. Thus Bartholomew is either "son of furrows" (i.e., rich in land) or "son of Ptolemy".

Bartholomew (Barry) is English or Scottish but also a Jewish surname with the same meaning as the above as a given name.

People with the given name 
 Bartholomew, one of the 12 Apostles of Jesus
 Bartholomew (Archdeacon of Waterford) (early 13th century)
 Bartholomaeus Parvus (died 1333), known as the Apostle of Armenia
 Bartholomaeus Anglicus, Franciscan encyclopedist of the thirteenth century
 Venerable Bartholomew of Braga (1514–1582) – Catholic Encyclopedia article
 Bartholomew of Braganca (c.1200–1271) – Catholic Encyclopedia article
 Bartholomew of Brescia (died 1258), Italian canonist – Catholic Encyclopedia article
 Bartholomew of Edessa, Syrian apologist and polemical writer – Catholic Encyclopedia article
 Bartholomew of Farne (died 1193), English Hermit and saint
 Bartholomew of Lucca (1227–1327), historian
 Any of three Medieval Pisans known as Bartholomew of Pisa, Catholic Encyclopedia article
 Bartholomew Albizzi (died 1342), Franciscan hagiographer
 Bartholomew Rinonico (died c.1401), Franciscan chronicler
 Bartholomew of San Concordio (1260–1347), canonist and man of letters – Catholic Encyclopedia article
 Fra Bartolomeo (1472–1517), Tuscan Renaissance artist
 Bartholomew Dias (died 1500), Portuguese maritime explorer, first European to sail round the Cape of Good Hope
 Bartholomew Columbus (1461–1515), cartographer, brother of Christopher Columbus, founder of Santo Domingo
 Bartolomé de las Casas (1484–1566) O.P., notable early campaigner against slavery associated with development of Human Rights ideas
 Bartholomew Gosnold (1571–1607), English lawyer, explorer and privateer
 Bartholomew Sharp (c.1650–1702), English pirate
 Bartholomew Roberts, "Black Bart" (1682–1722) infamous Welsh Pirate
 Bartholomew "Bart" Baker (born 1986), American entertainer and video producer
 Bartłomiej Pękiel, Polish composer in the 17th century
 Bartolomeo Vanzetti (1888–1927) Italian-born US anarchist
 Bartholomew "Bobby" Boriello (1929–1991), New York mobster
 Patriarch Bartholomew I of Constantinople (born 1940)
 Bartholomew Gilbert (died 1603), English sailor, explorer, captain

People with the surname 
 Allen Bartholomew (1925–2004), Australian criminologist
 Arthur Bartholomew (illustrator) (1833–1909), English-born Australian engraver, lithographer and natural history illustrator
 Arthur Bartholomew (cricketer) (1846–1940), English cricketer and schoolmaster
 Arthur Wollaston Bartholomew (1878–1945), British Army officer
 Arthur H. Bartholomew, mayor of Ansonia, Connecticut
 Augustus Theodore Bartholomew (1882–1933), British bibliographer and a librarian at Cambridge University
 Brent Bartholomew (born 1976), former NFL football punter
 Charles L. Bartholomew (1869–1949), American editorial cartoonist
 D.J. Bartholomew (1931–2017), British statistician
 Dave Bartholomew (1918–2019), American musician, composer & promoter
 David Ewen Bartholomew (c. 1767–1821), British naval officer
 Doris Bartholomew (born 1930), American linguist
 Freddie Bartholomew (1924–1992), British actor and filmmaker
 George Bartholomew (inventor), American inventor of concrete pavement
 George Bartholomew (biologist) (1919-2006), American biologist
 Harland Bartholomew (1889–1989), American urban planner
 Herbert A. Bartholomew (1871–1958), New York politician
 Ian Bartholomew (born 1954), English actor
 Jack Bartholomew (rugby league) (1888-1965), English rugby league footballer who played in the 1910s and 1920s, uncle of Eric Morecambe
 The noted cartographers of the Edinburgh engraving firm John Bartholomew and Son:
 John Bartholomew Senior (1805–1861), the founder
 John Bartholomew Junior (1831–1893), son of the founder, who developed colour contouring
 John George Bartholomew (1860–1920), son of John Junior
 John (Ian) Bartholomew (1890–1962), son of John George
 John Christopher Bartholomew (1923–2008), son of Ian
 John Eric Bartholomew (1926–1984), birth name of comedian Eric Morecambe, nephew of Jack Bartholomew
 Joseph Bartholomew (disambiguation)
 Joshua Bartholomew (born 1984), Canadian singer-songwriter
 Ken Bartholomew (born 1920), U.S. speed skater
 Les Bartholomew (1903–1972), American baseball player
 Linda Bartholomew (1949–2010), singer-songwriter
 Lindsay Bartholomew (born 1944), English painter
 Logan Bartholomew (born 1984), American actor
 Matthew Bartholomew (born 1968), Trinidad & Tobago football player
 Pablo Bartholomew (born 1955), Indian photojournalist
 Paul Bartholomew (1883–1973), American architect
 Peter Bartholomew (died 1099), French soldier of the First Crusade
 Phyllis Bartholomew (1914–2002), English long jumper
 Reginald Bartholomew (born 1936), American diplomat
 Richard Bartholomew (1926–1985), Burmese-Indian art critic and photographer
 Riley Bartholomew, Minnesota state senator (18591860)
 Rondell Bartholomew (born 1990), Grenadian 400 metres sprinter
 Sam Bartholomew, (1917–1999), American NFL fullback
 Summer Bartholomew (born 1951), U.S. model and actress
 Valentine Bartholomew (1799-1879), painter
 William Bartholomew (1877–1962), British general
 William Bartholomew (cricketer), English cricketer
 Will Bartholomew (born 1980), American football fullback
 Winifred Rushforth (née Bartholomew), noted Jungian psychoanalyst, distant relative of the above cartographers

Fictional characters 
 Bartholomew Cubbins, protagonist of the Dr. Seuss books The 500 Hats of Bartholomew Cubbins and Bartholomew and the Oobleck
 Dr. Bartholomew Oobleck, a character in the RWBY web series, named in reference to Bartholomew and the Oobleck
 Bartholomew, the drunk mouse in The Great Mouse Detective
 Bartholomew J. Simpson, better known as Bart, from The Simpsons
 Bartholomew Kuma, cyborg pirate from the manga One Piece
 Bart Bass, father of Chuck Bass, main character in the television series Gossip Girl
 DC Comics superheroes the Flash (Bartholomew "Barry" Allen) and Impulse (Bartholomew "Bart" Allen II)
 Bartholomew Estheim, father of Hope Estheim in the RPG video game Final Fantasy XIII
 Bartholomew, son of the Countess Elisabeth from American Horror Story: Hotel
Chief Bartholomew Berry, Hapless police chief in the 2012 Gershwin pastiche Nice Work If You Can Get It

The name Bartholomew in other languages 
 Albanian: Bartolomeu
 Amharic: በርተሎሜዎስ (Berteloméwos)
 Arabic:  بَرثُولَماوُس (Barthūlamāwus)
 Aragonese: Bertolomeu
 Aramaic: בר-תולמי (Bar-Tolmi), Tolmi's son
 Armenian: Բարթողիմէոս (Partoghimeos), Բարդուղիմեոս (Bardughimeos)
 Azerbaijani: Bartolumay
 Basque: Bartolome
 Belarusian: Варфаламей (Varfalamiej)
 Bengali: বর্থলময় (Barthalamaẏa)
 Bulgarian:  (Vartolomeĭ)
 Catalan: Bartomeu, Bartolomé, Bertomeu, Tomeu
 Cebuano: Bartolome
 Chinese: 巴多羅買 (pronounced Baduoluomai); 白 (meaning "white", pronounced Pak in Wade-Giles Cantonese or Bái in Pinyin Mandarin) as a single-character family name
 Chinese Simplified: 巴塞洛缪 (Basè luò móu)巴爾多祿茂
 Chinese Traditional: 巴塞洛繆 (Basè luò móu)巴尔多禄茂
 Croatian: Bartolomej
 Czech: Bartoloměj
 Danish: Bartolomæus
 Dutch: Bartholomeus
 English: Bartholomew (full name/formal); Bart (diminutive)
 Esperanto: Bartolomé
 Faroese: Bartal
 Finnish: Perttu or Pärttyli
 French: Barthélemy
 Galician: Bartolomeu
 Georgian: ბართლომე (Bart’lome)
 German: Bartholomäus
 Greek: Βαρθολομαίος (Bartholomaios, Vartholomaios, Vartholomaíos)
 Haitian Creole: Batèlmi
 Hebrew:  (Netan-el), which means "God has given";  (Bar-Talmai), meaning Talmai's son
 Hungarian: Bertalan (given name), Bartal, Bartos, Bartó (last names)
 Icelandic: Bartólómeus
 Indonesian: Bartolomeus 
 Irish: Bairtliméad or Parthálan (Parthálan is etymologically unrelated to Bartholomew)
 Italian: Bartolomeo
 Japanese: バーソロミュー (Bāsoromyū, used in transcription from English name), バルトロマイ (Barutoromai, most popular transcription in Japanese Bible etc.), ワルフォロメイ (Waruforomei, only used in Japanese Orthodox Church)
 Javanese: Bartholomayo
 Kannada: ಬಾರ್ಥೊಲೊಮೆವ್ (Bārtholomev)
 Korean: 바르톨로메오 (Baleutollomyu) (learned); 바돌로메(vernacular)
 Latin: Bartholomeus/Bartholomaeus
 Latvian: Bartlomejs
 Lithuanian: Baltramiejus
 Low German: Bartholomäus
 Macedonian: Вартоломеј (Bartolomej)
 Maltese: Bartoloméw (learned); Bartilméw (vernacular)
 Māori: Patoromu
 Milanese: Bartolamee
 Nepali: बार्थोलोमाइको (Bārthōlōmā'ikō)
 Norwegian: Bartolomeus
 Persian: بارتولومیو
 Peruvian Spanish: Bartuco (vernacular)
 Polish: Bartłomiej (masculine version), Bartłomieja (feminine version; rare); Bartosz (masculine) is a separate name that derives from Bartłomiej
 Portuguese: Bartolomeu
 Provençal: Barthomieu
 Punjabi: ਬਰਤੁਲਮਈ (Baratulama'ī)
 Romanian: Bartolomeu
 Russian: Варфоломей (Varfolomei, Varfolomey)
 Scottish Gaelic: Pàrlan (etymologically unrelated to Bartholomew)
 Serbian:  (in Serbian Cyrillic), Vartolomej (in Latin script)
 Slovak: Bartolomej
 Slovene: Jernej
 Somali: Bartolomayos
 Spanish: Bartolomé, Bartolomeo
 Swedish: Bartolomaios, Bartolomeus (older transcription)
 Tagalog: Bartolome,  (one of Jesus' Disciples)
 Tamil: பர்த்தலோமிவ் (Parttalōmiv)
 Telugu: బర్తలోమ్యోవ్ (Bartalōmyōv)
 Thai: บาร์โธโลมิ (Bār̒ ṭho lomi)
 Turkish: Bartalmay
 Ukrainian: Варфоломій (Varfolomiy)
 Urdu: برتلمائی

See also 
 
 
 Bart

References 

English masculine given names
English-language surnames
Patronymic surnames
Modern names of Hebrew origin
Aramaic-language names